Chubanlar-e Sardarlu (also Romanized as Chūbānlār-e Sardārlū; also known as Chobanar, Chobānlār Sardārlū, Chūpānlār, Chūpānlār-e Sardārlū, and Chūpānlār Sardārlū) is a village in Mavazekhan-e Shomali Rural District, Khvajeh District, Heris County, East Azerbaijan Province, Iran. At the 2006 census, its population was 427, in 92 families.

References 

Populated places in Heris County